HMS Banka was a British minesweeper which was officially sunk on 9 December 1941 (but in reality probably the night of the 7 December 1941) by a mine off the coast of Malaysia. Its crew of four British officers and 40 Malays all died with the exception of six Malay crew.

It had been deployed to assist the British, Australian and Indian land forces in stopping the Japanese invasion of Malaya.

HMS Bankas final resting position is at 57m, 12 nm NE of Tioman Is. near the two sunken Dutch submarines (O 16 and K XVII) on the same mine line laid by Japanese ship Tatsumiya Maru. On 6 December 1941 IJN Minelayer Tatsumiya Maru laid a line of 456 mines from North of Tioman to the Anambas Islands.

She most likely struck the mine on the night of 7 December, just one day after the field was laid. As she was recalled (from East Malay coast) on 6 December and was overdue in Singapore on 9 December. According to the survivor accounts it was dark at the time of the explosion.

Crew

§

Gallery

References

External links
 http://www.dutchsubmarines.com
 http://www.combinedfleet.com/Tatsumiya_t.htm
 https://www.marhisdata.nl/schip?id=5905

Minesweepers of the Royal Navy
Maritime incidents in December 1941